George Romans (30 November 1876 – 2 January 1946) was an English cricketer.  Romans was a right-handed batsman.  He was born in Gloucester, Gloucestershire.

Romans made his first-class debut for Gloucestershire against Somerset in the 1899 County Championship.  He made ten further first-class appearances for the county, the last of which came against Somerset in the 1903 County Championship.  In his eleven first-class appearances for Gloucestershire, he scored a total of 318 runs, which came at an average of 13.62, with a high score of 62.  This score was his only half century and came against London County in 1903.

He died at Bedminster, Somerset on 2 January 1946.

References

External links
George Romans at ESPNcricinfo
George Romans at CricketArchive

1876 births
1946 deaths
Cricketers from Gloucester
English cricketers
Gloucestershire cricketers